Ulyanovo is the name of several rural localities in Russia:
Ulyanovo, Arkhangelsk Oblast, a village in Rakulsky Selsoviet of Kholmogorsky District in Arkhangelsk Oblast
Ulyanovo, Ilyinsky District, Ivanovo Oblast, a village in Ilyinsky District of Ivanovo Oblast
Ulyanovo, Kineshemsky District, Ivanovo Oblast, a village in Kineshemsky District of Ivanovo Oblast
Ulyanovo, Kaliningrad Oblast, a settlement in Luninsky Rural Okrug of Nemansky District in Kaliningrad Oblast
Ulyanovo, Kaluga Oblast, a selo in Ulyanovsky District of Kaluga Oblast
Ulyanovo, Kirov Oblast, a village in Istobensky Rural Okrug of Orichevsky District in Kirov Oblast; 
Ulyanovo, Komi Republic, a settlement in Kuzhba Selo Administrative Territory of Ust-Kulomsky District in the Komi Republic; 
Ulyanovo, Krasnodar Krai, a khutor in Kostromskoy Rural Okrug of Mostovsky District in Krasnodar Krai; 
Ulyanovo, Moscow Oblast, a village in Poretskoye Rural Settlement of Mozhaysky District in Moscow Oblast
Ulyanovo, Bor, Nizhny Novgorod Oblast, a village in Kantaurovsky Selsoviet under the administrative jurisdiction of the town of oblast significance of Bor in Nizhny Novgorod Oblast
Ulyanovo, Lukoyanovsky District, Nizhny Novgorod Oblast, a selo under the administrative jurisdiction of the town of district significance of Lukoyanov in Lukoyanovsky District of Nizhny Novgorod Oblast
Ulyanovo, Perm Krai, a village in Kungursky District of Perm Krai
Ulyanovo, Opochetsky District, Pskov Oblast, a village in Opochetsky District of Pskov Oblast
Ulyanovo, Ostrovsky District, Pskov Oblast, a village in Ostrovsky District of Pskov Oblast
Ulyanovo, Kalininsky District, Tver Oblast, a village in Verkhnevolzhskoye Rural Settlement of Kalininsky District in Tver Oblast
Ulyanovo, Kuvshinovsky District, Tver Oblast, a village in Bolshekuznechkovskoye Rural Settlement of Kuvshinovsky District in Tver Oblast
Ulyanovo, Zubtsovsky District, Tver Oblast, a village in Ulyanovskoye Rural Settlement of Zubtsovsky District in Tver Oblast
Ulyanovo, Vologda Oblast, a village in Irdomatsky Selsoviet of Cherepovetsky District in Vologda Oblast
Ulyanovo, Gavrilov-Yamsky District, Yaroslavl Oblast, a village in Stoginsky Rural Okrug of Gavrilov-Yamsky District in Yaroslavl Oblast
Ulyanovo, Tutayevsky District, Yaroslavl Oblast, a village in Pomogalovsky Rural Okrug of Tutayevsky District in Yaroslavl Oblast
Ulyanovo, Uglichsky District, Yaroslavl Oblast, a village in Otradnovsky Rural Okrug of Uglichsky District in Yaroslavl Oblast